List of justices of the Supreme Court of Sri Lanka by court composition.

See also
 List of chief justices of Sri Lanka
 List of justices of the Supreme Court of Sri Lanka

References